is a Prefectural Natural Park in Western Tokyo, Japan. The park was established in 1950.

See also
 National Parks of Japan
 Parks and gardens in Tokyo
 Mount Takao
 Meiji no Mori Takao Quasi-National Park

References

Parks and gardens in Tokyo
Protected areas established in 1950
1950 establishments in Japan